Supercard of Honor XI was the 11th Supercard of Honor professional wrestling pay-per-view event produced by American promotion Ring of Honor (ROH). It took place Saturday, April 1, 2017, at the Lakeland Center (Jenkins Arena) in Lakeland, Florida. With an attendance of 3,500, the event set a new ROH attendance record.

Storylines
This professional wrestling event featured professional wrestling matches, which involve different wrestlers from pre-existing scripted feuds, plots, and storylines that played out on ROH's television programs. Wrestlers portrayed villains or heroes as they followed a series of events that built tension and culminated in a wrestling match or series of matches.

Through partnerships with New Japan Pro-Wrestling (NJPW) and Mexico's Consejo Mundial de Lucha Libre (CMLL), wrestlers from those two promotions also appeared on the card. NJPW wrestlers Jushin Thunder Liger and Yoshi-Hashi were originally scheduled to take part in the event, but were forced to pull out due to visa issues. They were replaced by Guerrillas of Destiny (Tama Tonga and Tanga Loa).

Results

References

Professional wrestling in Florida
Events in Florida
Events in Lakeland, Florida
2017 in professional wrestling in Florida
ROH Supercard of Honor
April 2017 events in the United States
2017 Ring of Honor pay-per-view events